JSX (JavaScript Syntax Extension and occasionally referred as JavaScript XML) is an extension to the JavaScript language syntax which provides a way to structure component rendering using syntax familiar to many developers commonly used in React. It is similar in appearance to HTML. 

React components are typically written using JSX, although they do not have to be as components may also be written in pure JavaScript. JSX is created by Meta (formerly Facebook). It is similar to another extension syntax created by Meta for PHP called XHP.

Markup
An example of JSX code:
const App = => {
   return (
     <div>
       <p>Header</p>
       <p>Content</p>
       <p>Footer</p>
     </div>
   ); 
}

Nested elements
Multiple elements on the same level need to be wrapped in a single React element such as the <div> element shown above, a fragment delineated by <Fragment> or in its shorthand form <>, or returned as an array.

Attributes
JSX provides a range of element attributes designed to mirror those provided by HTML. Custom attributes can also be passed to the component. All attributes will be received by the component as props.

JavaScript expressions
JavaScript expressions (but not statements) can be used inside JSX with curly brackets {}:
  <h1>{10+1}</h1>

The example above will render:
  <h1>11</h1>

Conditional expressions
If–else statements cannot be used inside JSX but conditional expressions can be used instead.
The example below will render  as the string 'true' because i is equal to 1.
const App = => {
   const i = 1;

   return (
     <div>
       <h1>{ i === 1 ? 'true' : 'false' }</h1>
     </div>
   );
}
The above will render:
<div>
  <h1>true</h1>
</div>

Functions and JSX can be used in conditionals:
const App = => {
   const sections = [1, 2, 3];

   return (
     <div>
       {sections.map((n,i) => (
           /* 'key' is used by react to keep track of list items and their changes */
           /* Each 'key' must be unique */
           <div key={"section-" + n}>
               Section {n} {i === 0 && <span>(first)</span>}
           </div>
       ))}
     </div>
   );
}

The above will render:
<div>
  <div>Section 1<span>(first)</span></div>
  <div>Section 2</div>
  <div>Section 3</div>
</div>

Code written in JSX requires conversion with a tool such as Babel before it can be understood by web browsers. This processing is generally performed during a software build process before the application is deployed.

See also
 ECMAScript for XML

References

External links
 

2014 software
Facebook software
JavaScript
Open formats
XML markup languages